Bhairav or Bhairab often refers to;
 Bhairava, a fierce manifestation of Lord Shiva

Bhairav or Bhairab may also refer to:

Geography
Bhairav (Gujarat), a village in Gujarat, India
Bhairab Nath, a village in Bajhang District in the Seti Zone of Nepal
Kot Bhairab, a village in Bajhang District in the Seti Zone of Nepal
Bhairab River, a river in the south of Bangladesh
Bhairab Upazila, an Upazila of Kishoreganj district, Dhaka Division, Bangladesh

Other
Bhairav (raga)
Bhairon (tantrik), the tantrik associated with the story of Vaishno Devi, who was killed by her
Bhairab Dutt Pande (born 1917), governor of Indian states of West Bengal (1981–1983) and Punjab (1983–1984)
Bhairab Ganguly College, a university college in Belgharia, Kolkata, West Bengal, India

See also
Ahir Bhairav, a raga in Hindustani classical music related to raga Bhairav
Akash Bhairab or Akash Bhairav, a Hindu deity
Bada Bhairab, a village development committee in Dailekh District in the Bheri Zone of Nepal
Kal Bhairab (disambiguation)
Nat Bhairav, a raga in Hindustani classical music related to raga Bhairav